Though small in absolute diversity of genera, the Hemitheini are nonetheless the largest tribes of geometer moths in the subfamily Geometrinae. Like most Geometrinae, they are small greenish "emerald moths". The tribe was first described by Charles Théophile Bruand d'Uzelle in 1846.

In some treatments the Comostolini, Hemistolini, Jodini, Microloxiini, Thalassodini and Thalerini are split off as independent tribes. But they are probably paraphyletic among themselves and with respect to the remaining Hemitheini. Consequently, until more information is available they are included in the Hemitheini here.

In other systems, the Geometrinae are defined in a more inclusive way; the Hemitheini are then ranked as a subtribe Hemitheiti.

Selected genera and species
A few Geometrinae genera are not yet assigned to a tribe with certainty; some of them might belong here too.

 Albinospila - formerly in Prasinocyma
 Anoplosceles
 Aoshakuna Matsumura, 1925 - often included in Chlorissa; includes Nipponogelasma
 Aporandria
 Berta
 Chlorissa Stephens, 1831
 Chloristola
 Chlorochlamys Hulst, 1896
 Chloropteryx Hulst, 1896
 Culpinia Prout, 1912
 Comostola Meyrick, 1888
 Dyschloropsis Warren, 1895
 Episothalma
 Eretmopus
 Gelasma Warren, 1893
 Hemistola Warren, 1893
 Hemithea Duponchel, 1829
 Common emerald, Hemithea aestivaria
 Hethemia Ferguson, 1969
 Idiochlora Warren, 1896
 Jodis Hübner, 1823
 Jodis putata
 Maxates
 Mesothea Warren, 1901
 Microloxia Warren, 1893
 Mujiaoshakua Inoue, 1955
 Oenospila
 Olerospila
 Orothalassodes
 Pamphlebia
 Pelagodes
 Thalassodes
 Thalera Hübner, 1823
 Xerochlora Ferguson, 1969

Footnotes

References

  (2007): Taxonomic changes in the emerald moths (Lepidoptera: Geometridae, Geometrinae) of East Asia, with notes on the systematics and phylogeny of Hemitheini. Zootaxa 1584: 55–68. PDF abstract and first page text
  (2008): Family group names in Geometridae. Retrieved 22 July 2008.
  (1996): The Moths of Borneo: Family Geometridae, Subfamilies Oenochrominae, Desmobathrinae and Geometrinae. Malayan Nature Journal 49(3/4): 147-326.
  (2007): Markku Savela's Lepidoptera and some other life forms: Geometrinae. Version of 2 February 2007. Retrieved 7 July 2008.

 
Geometrinae